The Detroit Metro Times is a progressive alternative weekly located in Detroit, Michigan.  It is the largest circulating weekly newspaper in the metro Detroit area.

History and content 
Supported entirely by advertising, it is distributed free of charge every Wednesday in newsstands in businesses and libraries around the city and suburbs. Compared to the two dailies, the Detroit Free Press and the Detroit News, the Metro Times has a liberal orientation, like its later competitor Real Detroit Weekly. Average circulation for the Metro Times is 50,000 weekly and is available at more than 1,200 locations. Average readership is just over 700,000 weekly.

Its annual "Best of Detroit" survey awards local businesses. The categories include "Public Square" (city life); "Spend the Night" (nightlife and bars); "Nutritional Value" (restaurants and food); and "Real Deal" (retail and other stores).

Syndicated alternative comics run by the Metro Times have in the past included Perry Bible Fellowship, This Modern World, Eric Monster Millikin and Red Meat. The  Metro Times also prints Dan Savage's Savage Love sex advice column (which replaced Isadora Alman's Ask Isadora sex advice column) and Cal Garrison's Horoscopes (which replaced Rob Brezsny's Free Will Astrology). Starting with the January 19–25  issue, the Metro Times had its own exclusive crossword, crafted by Brooklyn-based cruciverbalist Ben Tausig, who appears in the documentary Wordplay. Editors cut the crossword in May 2008 to save space.

The paper was founded in 1980 by publisher and editor Ron Williams. In December 2012, Metro Times Editor W. Kim Heron announced his departure. Heron had previously been the paper's managing editor. In March 2013, after three months during which Michael Jackman was interim editor, the publisher named Bryan Gottlieb as Editor-in-Chief.

In April 2014, Valerie Vande Panne, former editor of High Times, was named editor-in-chief. In May 2014, the Metro Times merged with Real Detroit Weekly, which had been a Detroit-area alternative weekly paper since 1999. Dustin Blitchok took over as editor-in-chief in February 2016, before resigning from the position in November of the same year. Former Metro Times staff writer and associate editor for Hour Detroit Lee DeVito was named editor-in-chief following Blitchok's departure.
 
The Metro Times was an official sponsor of the now-defunct Detroit Festival of the Arts and had one of the stages named after it.

The Metro Times, is well known for its progressive news and opinion.

Offices

The headquarters are located in Midtown Detroit. It was previously headquartered in the Detroit Cornice and Slate Company Building in Downtown Detroit. The Metro Times moved to the Cornice and Slate building in the 1990s and building owners constructed a wraparound expansion to give the newspaper additional room. In 2013 Blue Cross Blue Shield purchased the Cornice and Slate building, forcing the Metro Times to move to a leased space in Ferndale. According to editor-in-chief Lee DeVito, the newspaper intended to eventually return to Detroit. In 2018, Metro Times returned to Detroit, moving into the Arnold E. Frank Building in Midtown.

References

External links

 Official website

Newspapers published in Detroit
Alternative weekly newspapers published in the United States
1980 establishments in Michigan
Publications established in 1980
Progressivism in the United States